Christopherus Stephani Bellinus (died 1607 in Irsta, Västmanland County) was a Swedish priest, and Member of the Clergy of the Riksdag of the Estates of Sweden.

Biography
Christopherus Stephani Bellinus was a brother of Bishop Olaus Stephani Bellinus, among others. A daughter of Christopherus Bellinus was married to Samuel Olai Normontanus.

Christopherus Bellinus was appointed Chaplain at the Royal Court of Sweden in 1579, and vicar in Irsta in 1586.

Bellinus participated in the Uppsala Synod in 1593, and signed its documentation. He served as Member of the Clergy of the Riksdag of the Estates of Sweden in 1594, as one of the signing participants in support of the throne pretendence of King Sigismund.

Sources
 Ihrsta

1607 deaths
Members of the Riksdag of the Estates
16th-century Swedish Lutheran priests
16th-century births
17th-century Swedish Lutheran priests
People from Västerås Municipality
16th-century Swedish politicians